The Stoosbahn, also known as the Schwyz–Stoos funicular or Standseilbahn Schwyz–Stoos, is a funicular railway in the Swiss canton of Schwyz. It connects the Hintere Schlattli in the municipalities of Muotatal, Morschach, and Schwyz with the village and mountain resort of Stoos, above Morschach. On a length of 1.7 kilometres (1.1 mi), it overcomes a height difference of 744 metres (2,441 ft). The carriages are barrel-shaped and rotate to maintain a level floor surface for passengers. Construction took five years and cost 52 million Swiss francs.

The new line has a maximum gradient of 110% (47.7°) and is the steepest funicular railway in Switzerland and Europe, superseding the Gelmerbahn. It has been widely claimed to be the steepest in the world, and although the Katoomba Scenic Railway in Australia is steeper, with a maximum gradient of 122%, it uses a winch system and is, therefore, an incline lift and not a funicular railway.

References

External links 

 Official site

Funicular railways in Switzerland
Transport in the canton of Schwyz
1200 mm gauge railways in Switzerland
Railway lines opened in 2017